Glyceraldehyde-3-phosphate dehydrogenase, spermatogenic or glyceraldehyde-3-phosphate dehydrogenase, testis-specific is an enzyme that in humans is encoded by the GAPDHS gene.

Function 

This gene encodes a protein belonging to the glyceraldehyde-3-phosphate dehydrogenase family of enzymes that play an important role in carbohydrate metabolism. Like its somatic cell counterpart, this sperm-specific enzyme functions in a nicotinamide adenine dinucleotide-dependent manner to remove hydrogen and add phosphate to glyceraldehyde 3-phosphate to form 1,3-diphosphoglycerate. During spermiogenesis, this enzyme may play an important role in regulating the switch between different energy-producing pathways, and it is required for sperm motility and male fertility.

In melanocytic cells GAPDHS gene expression may be regulated by MITF.

Interactive pathway map

References

Further reading